The following is a list of episodes for the British reality series The Only Way Is Essex that first aired on ITV2 on 10 October 2010. In 2014, the series was moved to ITVBe, beginning with the thirteenth series.

Series overview

Episodes

Series 1 (2010)

Series 2 (2011)

Series 3 (2011)

Series 4 (2012)

Series 5 (2012)

Series 6 (2012)

Series 7 (2012)

Series 8 (2013)

Series 9 (2013)

Series 10 (2013)

Series 11 (2014)

Series 12 (2014)

Series 13 (2014)

Series 14 (2015)

Series 15 (2015)

Series 16 (2015)

Series 17 (2016)

Series 18 (2016)

Series 19 (2016)

Series 20 (2017)

Series 21 (2017)

Series 22 (2018)

Series 23 (2018)

Series 24 (2019)

Series 25 (2019)

Series 26 (2020)

Series 27 (2021)

Series 28 (2021)

Series 29 (2022)

Specials

References 

Lists of British reality television series episodes
Episodes